

The Masonic Temple is a historic Masonic building in Philadelphia. Located at 1 North Broad Street, directly across from Philadelphia City Hall, it serves as the headquarters of the Grand Lodge of Pennsylvania, Free and Accepted Masons. The Temple features the Masonic Library and Museum of Pennsylvania, and receives thousands of visitors every year to view the ornate structure, which includes seven lodge rooms, where today a number of Philadelphia lodges and the Grand Lodge conduct their meetings.

The Temple was designed in the medieval Norman style by James H. Windrim, who was 27 years old at the time he won the design competition. The massive granite cornerstone, weighing ten tons, was leveled on St. John the Baptist's Day, June 24, 1868. The ceremonial gavel used on that day by Grand Master Richard Vaux was the same gavel used by President George Washington in leveling the cornerstone of the nation's Capitol building in 1793.

The construction was completed five years later, in 1873.  The interior, designed by George Herzog, was begun in 1887 and took another fifteen years to finish.

The bold and elaborate elevations on Broad and Filbert Streets, especially the beautiful portico of Quincy granite, make it one of the great architectural wonders of Philadelphia. The exterior stone of the building on Broad and Filbert Streets is Cape Ann Syenite from Syne in Upper Egypt.

On May 27, 1971, the Temple was listed on the National Register of Historic Places. It was designated a National Historic Landmark in 1985.  It was cited in its landmark designation as one of the nation's most elaborate examples of Masonic architecture.

Gallery

See also

James H. Windrim (architect of the Masonic Temple)
William Rush (sculptor)
Joseph A. Bailly (sculptor)
List of National Historic Landmarks in Philadelphia
National Register of Historic Places listings in Center City, Philadelphia

References

External links

Philadelphia Masonic Temple Website
Listing and photographs at the Historic American Buildings Survey
Listing at Philadelphia Architects and Buildings

Clubhouses on the National Register of Historic Places in Philadelphia
Masonic buildings completed in 1873
National Historic Landmarks in Pennsylvania
Masonic buildings in Pennsylvania
Museums in Philadelphia
Masonic museums in the United States
Market East, Philadelphia